Angels' Fall is an adventure/thriller novel written by Frank Herbert in 1957 and published posthumously in 2013.

Plot summary
After crashing in the Amazon rainforest, pilot Jeb Logan leads his small group of passengers on a desperate journey of survival.

References

2013 American novels
American adventure novels
American thriller novels
Novels by Frank Herbert
Novels published posthumously